Gary Singer is an Australian politician. He was the Deputy Lord Mayor of the City of Melbourne from 2004 to 2008, serving under John So. He ran to succeed So as Lord Mayor upon his retirement in 2008, but was defeated by former state Liberal Party leader Robert Doyle.

Singer has a background as a consultant, lawyer and manager of Simon Parsons & Co Lawyers. He is also a barrister and solicitor of the Supreme Court of Victoria. Singer holds a Bachelor of Economics and a Bachelor of Law degree.

Singer is openly gay; his partner is Geoffrey Smith. In 2007, Singer and Councillor Fraser Brindley gave recognition to same sex couples by obtaining an in-principle support for the council to set up a Relationships Declaration Register, a first in Victoria.

References

External links
 Singer's profile on the City of Melbourne's website
 Singer's campaign site for the 2008 Melbourne City Council elections

Lawyers from Melbourne
Politicians from Melbourne
Year of birth missing (living people)
Living people
Gay politicians
Australian barristers
Australian solicitors
Australian LGBT politicians